Kanniyakumari district is one of the 38 districts in Tamil Nadu state and the southernmost district in mainland India. It stands second in terms of population density among the districts of Tamil Nadu. It is also the richest district in Tamil Nadu in terms of per capita income, and also tops the state in Human Development Index (HDI), literacy, and education. The district's headquarters is Nagercoil.

Kanniyakumari district has a varied topography with the sea on three sides and the mountains of the Western Ghats bordering the northern side. Except for a small stretch of land to the east of Kanniyakumari town, almost the entire district is sandwiched between the Western Ghats and the Arabian Sea – the only district in Tamilnadu state facing the Arabian Sea.

Geologically, the landmass of the district is much younger when compared to the rest of the state – faulted as late as 2.5 million years during the Miocene, after which numerous transgression, as well as regression of sea, had shaped the western coast of the district.

Historically, Nanjinad and Edai Nadu, which comprise the present-day Kanniyakumari district, were ruled by various Tamil and Malayalam dynasties: the Cheras, the Ay/Venad/Travancore dynasty, the Pandyans, the Chozhans and the Nayaks. A few artifacts have been unearthed by archeological excavations. It was part of the princely state of Travancore during the colonial times prior to India's independence; four of the eight tehsils of Thiruvananthapuram district were separated from the erstwhile Travancore Kingdom to form the new district of Kanniyakumari, and they were made the part of Madras Presidency under recommendations from the States Reorganisation Commission in 1956. The Presidency was later renamed Tamil Nadu and Kanniyakumari, today, is one of the 38 districts of Tamil Nadu state.

The district is the birthplace of Ayyavazhi. Many historical assumptions persist in the district and state, which associate sages such as Agastya, Vyasa, Tolkappiyar, Avvaiyar and Thiruvalluvar with the district.

History

The area that comprises the current Kanniyakumari district was a part of the old Ay kingdom of the first and second Sangam ages. Following the decline of the Ay kingdoms, the area became Venad, with its capital Padmanabhapuram located North, North West of Nagercoil. The wealth of the Nanjilnadu beckoned many invaded kings including the Nayaks during the reign of Umayamma Rani. The Venad region was in anarchy before Marthanda Varma ascended the throne in 1729 CE. Under their rule anarchy was dominant in Kanniyakumari region. However, Marthanda Varma brought a sense of disorder under control by annexing the nearby territories, putting down the feudal lords and establishing the strong state of Travancore. He had also bought some portions of Kanniyakumari from the then viceroy making it the southern boundary. Under his rule, the district improved in a social context as well as economically. The famous battle of Colachel took place in the district. Later, the Maharajas of Travancore built the forts at Aramboly (Aralvaimozhy) to prevent any invasion from the Carnatic Kings. Key elements of Velu Thampi Dalawa's revolt occurred in the area and the English East India company's army under Col.

Leger broke through the fortifications and entered Travancore in 1810. In the year 1949, the area became a part of the reestablished Travancore Cochin state. The people of Agasteeswarem, Thovalai, Kalkulam and Vilavancode taluks, which formed the southern divisions of the former district of Trivandrum, were predominantly Tamil speaking people. The present Kanniyakumari district was historically part of the erstwhile Travancore State. Four Tamil-speaking taluks viz., Vilavancode, Kalkulam, Thovala and Agastheeswaram which now form the Kanniyakumari district was transferred to Madras State on 1 November 1956. The changes that were effected between the taluks and the villages as on 1 October 1956 are furnished in the fly-leaf to Table A-I. An extreme agitation by Tamil speaking residents under the leadership of Marshal Nesamony took place for including Kanniyakumari within Tamil Nadu. Eventually the merger happened in 1956 based on language reorganization of states.

Historically, Nanjilnadu (Agastheeswaram and Thovalai taluks) and Eda Nadu (Vilavancode and Kalkulam taluks) which comprises the present Kanniyakumari district. The district were ruled by various dynasties: Venad Kingdom, Travancore Kingdom, the Cheras, the Cholas, the Ays and the Nayaks. A few artifacts were unearthed by archeological excavations in parts of the district. The district was part of the princely state of Travancore during the colonial times prior to India's independence; four of the eight tehsils of Thiruvananthapuram district were separated to form the new district of Kanniyakumari in 1956 following the demands of reunion made by the Tamil speaking majority people (about 70% of the population), who feels that their feelings were suppressed by the erstwhile Travancore Kingdom which has Malayalam-majority population. The four taluks were made the part of then Madras Presidency under recommendations from the States Reorganisation Commission in 1956. The Presidency was later renamed Tamil Nadu in 1969 and Kanniyakumari, today, is one of the 38 districts of Tamil Nadu state.

The district is the birthplace of Ayyavazhi, the henotheistic belief initiated by Hari Gopalan Seedar, one among the 5 prime disciples of Ayya Vaikundar. The social, religious and cultural history of the 19th century Kanniyakumari district is intrinsically inter-twined with those of Ayyavazhi. Many historical assumptions persist in the district and state, which associate with sages namely Vyasa, Agastya, Tolkappiyar, Avvaiyar and Thiruvalluvar.

Geography

Location 
The district is situated between 77°15' and 77°36' east longitude and 8°03' and 8°35' north latitude. The district has borders with Tirunelveli district in the North & North East, the Gulf of Mannar in the East, the Indian Ocean in the South, the Arabian Sea in the West and the Thiruvananthapuram District (Kerala) in the West.

Kanniyakumari District is divided into two regions: Edai nadu and Nanjil nadu. Vilavancode and Kalkulam taluks are in the Edai nadu region which consists of full stretched Western ghats. Thovalai and Agastheeswaram taluks are present in the Nanjil nadu region. Aralvaimozhy pass separates these two regions. Also the boundary of these regions is Vaezhimalai (Vaezhi Hills).

Kanniyakumari district has a varied topography with sea on three sides and the mountains of the Western Ghats bordering the northern side. Geologically, the landmass of the district is much younger when compared to the rest of state – faulted as late as 2.5 million years during the Miocene, after which numerous transgression, as well as regression of sea, had shaped the western coast of the district.

Politics

|}

Places of interest

 Thirparappu Waterfalls 

Thirparappu Waterfalls are waterfalls in Kanniyakumari District. It is also known as 'Courtallam of Kanniyakumari'. The  Mahadevar Temple is very near to the waterfalls.

 Manimedai 

Manimedai is the situated in the central part of Nagercoil. Manimedai literally means High Clock. It is the symbol of the Nagercoil Town. A clock is placed in a High Clock gauge, so the place becomes Manimedai. The construction of Clock gauge began in 1892 in the period of Travancore Maharajas. After construction, it was opened by His Highness Sree Moolam Thirunal Varma, the King of Travancore. The clock placed in the gauge was gifted to the English missionary in Nagercoil.

Mathur Aqueduct

The Mathur Aqueduct was built to pass the cultivable water between two mountains. Mathur Aqueduct was built between Aruvikkarai and Mudhalaaru in Paraliyaru River. The aqueduct was built by Former Chief Minister of Tamil Nadu Perunthalaivar Thiru Kamarajar. Mathur aqueduct was South Asia's largest aqueduct.

 Padmanabhapuram palace 

Before centuries, the houses that has all the facilities are known as Palaces. The rulers of states, the Kings resides in such Palaces. Padmanabhapuram Palace was once the official residence of Travancore Kings. Padmanabhapuram Palace was built in Kerala styled Architecture with woods. The palace was built in 18th century by Travancore King Thiru Anizham Thirunal Marthanda Varma. The palace was situated in 6.5 acres in 186 acres fort.  The palace is under the control of Kerala Government. The palace is situated just 2 km from Thuckalay.

 Udayagiri Fort 

Udayagiri Fort was situated just 10 km from Parvathipuram. The fort was situated in 22½ hectares in a place called Puliyoorkurichi.  The Fort is maintained by the Ministry of Forests, Government of Tamilnadu.

 Vattakkottai 

The word 'Vattakkottai' means Circle Fort and is circular. The Fort was constructed along the seashore in the East coast. The fort was situated in 3 1/2 acres with compound stones constructed for 25 meters in height and constructed by Travancore Army Chief Dilanai.  The fort is under the control of the Archaeological Department, Government of India. It is situated just 6;km north of Kanniyakumari and just 2 km south from Anjugramam.

Vivekananda Rock

Vivekananda Rock Memorial is a monument in Vavathurai in Kanniyakumari District. It is located just 500 meters east in the mainland of Vavathurai. The rock was built in 1970 in honor of Swami Vivekananda who is said to have attained enlightenment on the rock. Vivekanand was a disciple of Swami Ramakrishna Paramahansa. According to local legends, Goddess Kumari  performed Tapas in devotion of lord Shiva in these rocks. The rocks are surrounded by the Laccadive Sea.

Chitharal Jain Rock Cut Temple

It is famous for the Rock-cut temple. Hillock at Chitharal has a cave containing Rock-cut sculptures of Thirthankaras and attendant deities carved inside and outside dating back to 9th Century A.D by King Mahendra Varman I.

Administrative divisions
For administrative purposes, the district comprises six taluks: Thovalai, Agastheeswaram, Kalkulam, Killiyur, Thiruvattar and Vilavancode. It has nine blocks — Agastheeswaram, Rajakkamangalam, Thovalai, Kurunthancode, Thuckalay, Thiruvattar, Killiyur, Munchirai and Melpuram. There is a municipal corporation in the district which is Nagercoil. There are also four municipalities, they are Padmanabhapuram, Colachel, Kuzhithurai and Kollemcode.

At the lower levels of administration, there are 95 village panchayats and a further 55 special category village panchayats.

The major towns of the district include:
 Agastheeswaram taluk: Nagercoil, Kanniyakumari, Anjugramam, Agastheeswaram, Suchindram and Rajakkamangalam.
 Thovalai taluk: Boothapandi, Thovalai, Azhagiapandiapuram and Aralvaimozhy.
 Kalkulam taluk: Padmanabhapuram, Thuckalay, Colachel, Kalkulam, Thiruvithamcode, Eraniel, Kurunthancode, and Thingalnagar.
 Thiruvattar taluk: Thiruvattar, and Kulasekaram.
 Killiyur Taluk: Killiyur, and Karungal.
 Vilavancode Taluk: Kuzhithurai, Marthandam, Vilavancode, Kaliyakkavilai, Munchirai, Kollemcode,
 Manjalumoodu, Arumanai, and Melpuram.

Demographics
According to 2011 census, Kanniyakumari district had a population of 1,870,374 with a sex-ratio of 1,019 females for every 1,000 males, much above the national average of 929. A total of 182,350 were under the age of six, constituting 92,835 males and 89,515 females. Scheduled Castes and Scheduled Tribes accounted for 3.97% and 0.39% of the population respectively. The district had a total of 483,539 households. There were a total of 679,620 workers, comprising 12,229 cultivators, 51,350 main agricultural labourers, 21,078 in household industries, 468,001 other workers, 126,962 marginal workers, 3,381 marginal cultivators, 21,517 marginal agricultural labourers, 14,711 marginal workers in household industries and 87,353 other marginal workers.

The average literacy rate of Kanniyakumari in 2011 was 91.75 compared to 87.55 in 2001. If things are looked out at gender-wise, male and female literacy were 93.65 and 89.90 respectively. For the 2001 census, the same figures stood at 90.37 and 84.79 in Kanniyakumari District. The total number of literates in Kanniyakumari District were 1,548,738 of which male and female were 780,541 and 768,197 respectively. In 2001, Kanniyakumari District had 1,308,322 in its district.

Languages
Tamil is the most widely spoken language in Kanniyakumari district, though there is significant minority of Malayalam speakers (Malayalis). Kanniyakumari District has a Tamil dialect which is slightly different from other part of Tamil Nadu, since it has a little Malayalam influence. English can be understood by two-thirds of the district's population.

Urban population
Out of the total Kanniyakumari population for 2011 census, 82.33 percent lives in urban regions of district. In total 1,539,802 people lives in urban areas of which males are 761,407 and females are 778,395. Sex ratio in urban region of Kanniyakumari district is 1022 as per 2011 census data. Similarly child sex ratio in Kanniyakumari district was 966 in 2011 census. Child population (0-6) in urban region was 148,570 of which males and females were 75,573 and 72,997.

This child population figure of Kanniyakumari district is 9.93% of total urban population. Average literacy rate in Kanniyakumari district as per census 2011 is 91.96% of which males and females are 93.92% and 90.06% literates, respectively. In actual number 1,279,358 people are literate in urban region of which males and females are 644,109 and 635,249, respectively.

Rural population
As per 2011 census, 17.67% population of Kanniyakumari districts lives in rural areas of villages. The total Kanniyakumari district population living in rural areas is 330,572 of which males and females are 164,938 and 165,634 respectively. In rural areas of Kanniyakumari district, sex ratio is 1004 females per 1000 males. If child sex ratio data of Kanniyakumari district is considered, figure is 957 girls per 1000 boys. Child population in the age 0-6 is 33,780 in rural areas of which males were 17,262 and females were 16,518.

The child population comprises 10.47% of total rural population of Kanniyakumari district. Literacy rate in rural areas of Kanniyakumari district is 90.76% as per census data 2011. Gender wise, male and female literacy stood at 92.39 and 89.16 percent, respectively. In total, 269,380 people were literate of which males and females were 136,432 and 132,948, respectively.

Religion

 
As per 2011 census, total population of the district is 1,870,374, among them 909,872 (48.5%) are Hindus, 876,299 (47%) are Christians, 78,590 (4.2%) are Muslims, 438 (0.02%) are Buddhists, 160 (0.01%) are Sikhs, 156 (0.01%) are Jains, 10 (0.001%) are Others and 4,849 (0.26%) are "not stated".

Festivals

The Mandaikadu festival is celebrated in March by people of the district and by those in Kerala. Traditionally, participants would chant while walking while others would provide them with butter, milk, water, jaggery, and coffee. The festival, which is celebrated for ten days, later became a social function, especially on Sunday.

The Kollemcode Tookam festival is another famous festival celebrated by the people of the district and also by the people from the nearby Thiruvananthapuram district of Kerala state. It is celebrated for 10 days during the month of March/April with the famous Child Tookam taking place on the 10th day corresponding to Meena Bharani as per the Malayalam calendar.

The Ayya vaikunda Avataram of Ayyavazhi is widely celebrated throughout the district. The Kodiyettru Thirunal is celebrated in the religious headquarters of Swamithope pathi and attracts large crowds from Tamil Nadu and across India. Onam is also celebrated in many places throughout Kanniyakumari district, especially in the western part of the district.

Transport and highways

Roadways
There are two major National Highways (NH) roads originating from Kanniyakumari town. One is the National Highway 44 which connects Kanniyakumari with Srinagar of Jammu & Kashmir. NH 44 connects North India with South India. The road passes through Madurai, Hosur, Bengaluru, Hyderabad, Nagpur, Jhansi, Delhi and Jalandhar. It covers 3745 kilometres. The other is the National Highway 66 that connects Kanniyakumari with Panvel (38 km from Mumbai) in Maharashtra. NH 66 roughly runs north-south parallel to the western ghats. It passes through Thiruvananthapuram, Kochi, Kozhikode, Mangaluru, Udupi, Margoa and Ratnagiri. Nagercoil, the district capital is well connected with the rest of Tamil Nadu.

The government transport body State Express Transport Corporation (SETC) is operating direct buses to Chennai, Ootacamund, Coimbatore, Vellore, Chidambaram, Thiruchirappalli, Kodaikanal, Tirupur, Erode, Kalpakkam, Velankanni, and Thiruvannamalai. It also operates direct buses to Bengaluru, Pondicherry and Tirupati. Some bus services to the aforesaid destinations are originating from Kanniyakumari, Colachel, Marthandam, Kulasekaram, Kaliyakkavilai, and Thiruvananthapuram.

Another government transport body known as the Tamilnadu State Road Transport Corporation (TNSTC) operates direct buses to various destinations inside Tamil Nadu. Some of the terminating stations are Chennai, Tiruppur, Periyakulam, Kodaikanal, Rameswaram, Thiruchirappalli, Dindigul, Thanjavur, Palani, Salem, Coimbatore, Karaikudi, Kumily, Bodinayakkanur, Erode, and Sivakasi. Most of these buses starts their journey from Nagercoil while some buses starts from Kanniyakumari, Marthandam, Colachel, Kulasekaram, and Kaliyakkavilai. TNSTC also operates frequent bus services to Madurai, Tirunelveli, Tiruchendur, Tuticorin, and Thiruvananthapuram.

Railways
There is a railway station located at Kanniyakumari where trains terminate. The Vivek Express starting from Kanniyakumari is the longest-running train in India.  It connects Kanniyakumari with Dibrugarh, in Assam. Nagercoil Junction railway station is the district's primary railway station located near Kottar and is also commonly known as Kottar Railway station.  There is also another railway station in Nagercoil, known as Nagercoil Town railway station. There is rail connectivity from Nagercoil, the district capital, to most parts of the country with daily trains running to Mumbai, Chennai, Bengaluru, Guruvayur, Coimbatore, Trichy, Mangaluru, Tambaram etc. and weekly trains to New Delhi, Kolkata, Gujarat, Hyderabad, Pondicherry, Bilaspur, Rameswaram, North East India and Jammu and Kashmir. The other stations in the district are Eraniel, Palliyadi, Kuzhithurai, and Kuzhithurai west. Passenger trains connect Nagercoil with Thiruvananthapuram, Kollam, Punalur, Kottayam, Tirunelveli, Madurai, and Coimbatore.

Airways
The nearest International airport is Trivandrum International Airport which is 76 km from Kanniyakumari. The Civil Aviation Ministry is planning to construct an airport near Swamithoppu in Kanniyakumari District as the initiative attracts international tourists to the district.

Education

Schools and Colleges of higher education are found throughout the district.

The district is home to many well- established institutions like colleges such as Scott Christian College (est. 1809),[42] South Travancore Hindu College (est. 1952), Holy Cross College (est. 1965), Women Christian College and schools such as Scott Christian Higher Secondary School (est. 1819), Duthie Girls School (est. 1819), St. Joseph's Convent Higher Secondary School (est. 1910), Carmel Higher Secondary School (est. 1922), S.L.B. Government Higher Secondary School (est. 1924), S.M.R.V. Higher Secondary School (est. 1919).

The district has a literacy rate of 97.6% which is the highest in the state.

Forests

Of the total district area of 1671.3 km2, government forests occupy an area of 504.86 km2 which comes to about 30.2 percent of the geographical area of the district.

Flora and fauna
The flora and fauna of Kanniyakumari District are vast and diverse. Kanniyakumari district has 4 types of lands except Desert. In which, Forest has a significant place in the district's landscape. The district's forest areas were surrounded by plenty of rivers and falls. Forests also has significant mountainous landscape. The district has forests of 40239.55 Hectares. The district's forests are situated between Kalakkad Mundanthurai Tiger Reserve and Neyyar Forests in Kerala. Kaalikesam, Balamore, Upper Kodayar, Lower Kodayar, Mukkadal are the important places in Forests.

Rainfall
Achankadu hill is the tallest mountain peak in the district with a height of 1828 m. Hilly regions like Upper kodayar, Muthukuzhivayal and Achankadu hills receive more than 5000mm of annual rainfall which makes the region one of the wettest regions in Tamil Nadu. Kanniyakumari town which is located on the leeward side with no tall mountain ranges receives less rainfall in the district. Pechipara, Chittar dams 1&2, Perunchani dam and Surlacode receive annual rainfall between 2500 to 3000 mm. Kanniyakumari is the only district in Tamil Nadu that benefits from rains in all seasons.

Flora
The Kanniyakumari forests has sandal trees, teak trees, rosewood trees, Wild Jack trees. pepper and cloves are grown in private estates that operate in the forests. The district's forests have some 600 varieties of large trees and another 3500 varieties of small trees.

Fauna
Animals on the hills of the district include Bengal Tiger, Leopard, Indian elephant, Sambar Deer, Porcupines, Indian Pangolins and Indian Boar, while pied kingfisher and  painted stork are commonly found in the water bodies and wetlands. Reptiles include Bengal monitors, pythons, and other snakes.

The Keeriparai and Maramalai hills are habitats for wild elephants and Indian bison. The Kodayar hills are the breeding centers for the Indian rock pythons and Indian bison. The Theroor wetlands are home for varieties of storks and migratory birds during specific seasons. Trout and other varieties of freshwater fish are found in the Pechiparai reservoir. 

The district also has a wildlife sanctuary and a bird sanctuary.

Lakes
Parakkai Lake

See also
 List of districts of Tamil Nadu

References

Further reading

External links

 Official Website of Kanniyakumari district
 About Kanniyakumari district
General Introduction of Tamil Nadu

 
Districts of Tamil Nadu
1956 establishments in Madras State